Lundon may refer to

Locations
 Lundon is one of Old English names of London

People
Anne Lundon, Scottish broadcaster
DeLundon, American hip hop artist
John Lundon, Member of Parliament
John Lundon (cricketer), New Zealand cricketer
Sean Lundon, English footballer
Thomas Lundon, Irish nationalist politician
Tony Lundon, Irish singer
William Lundon, Irish nationalist politician